Bullion traditionally refers to gold, silver, and other precious metals in bars or ingots.

Bullion may also refer to:

 Bullion (surname)

Places
In the United States
 Bullion, Missouri
 Bullion, Nevada
 Mount Bullion, Alpine County, California
 Mount Bullion, Mariposa County, California

Elsewhere
 Bullion, Yvelines, France

See also 
 Bullions, a surname
 Bouillon (disambiguation)